The ATP 250 tournaments (previously known as the ATP World Tour 250 tournaments, ATP International Series, and ATP World Series) are the lowest tier of annual men's tennis tournaments on the main ATP Tour, after the four Grand Slam tournaments, ATP Finals, ATP Masters 1000 tournaments, and ATP 500 tournaments. As of 2020, the series includes 39 tournaments, with 250 ranking points awarded to each singles champion—which accounts for the name of the series. Draws consist of 28, 32, or 48 for singles and 16 for doubles. Thomas Muster holds the record for most singles titles at 26, while Mike Bryan holds the record for most doubles titles won with 46.

Historic names
1990–1999
ATP World Series

2000–2008
ATP International Series

2009–2018
ATP World Tour 250

2019–present
ATP Tour 250

ATP Points

 Players with byes receive first round points.

Tournaments

 became an ATP 500 event.

Singles champions

ATP International Series

ATP World Tour 250

ATP Tour 250

Doubles champions

ATP International Series

ATP World Tour 250

ATP Tour 250

Statistics
Active players indicated in bold.

Most titles

Notes

See also
 Grand Slam (tennis)
 ATP Finals
 ATP Tour Masters 1000
 ATP Tour 500

References

External links
 Association of Tennis Professionals (ATP) official website
International Tennis Federation (ITF) official website